JX may refer to:

People 
 JX, an early alias of DJ Jake Williams
 J. X. Williams, a pseudonym used by several different authors during the 1960s for many adult novels
 Jesus Christ

Technology 
 Roland JX-3P, a MIDI capable synthesizer keyboard which debuted in 1983
 JX (operating system), a Java operating system
 IBM JX, a personal computer that based on IBM PCjr, released in Japan, in 1984

Other uses 
 Jx or jx, a digraph in the Esperanto x-system orthography
 Starlux Airlines, a Taiwanese airline (IATA code JX since 2020)
 Jiangxi, a province of China (Guobiao abbreviation JX)